Jenna Lee-James (born in 1976) is a British singer who has played the part of Scaramouche in the West End version of the hit musical We Will Rock You. She also appeared in West End at Home which played at a variety of theatres including the Mayflower Theatre, Southampton. She appeared as the Narrator in Joseph and the Amazing Technicolor Dreamcoat at the Adelphi Theatre, London alongside Gareth Gates.

Lee-James was born in Clydebank in 1976, where she started her career at the age of 10 in pantomime at the King's Theatre. She also played July in Annie, Maisie in The Boy Friend and Dorothy in The Wizard of Oz, all at the Kings.

She began her professional career on a tour of Bobby Davro's Rock with Laughter. Other theatre credits include Tiger Lily in Peter Pan at the Theatre Royal, Newcastle with Leslie Grantham and Joe Pasquale; Lorraine in the UK tour of Boogie Nights with Shane Ritchie; principal singer in the tour Money Money Money – The Real ABBA Story; and Peter Pan at the Grand Theatre Swansea with Dora Bryan, John Challis and Mike Doyle.

Lee-James was runner-up in the Voice of Musical Theatre 2005 competition held at the New Theatre, Cardiff.

In 2008 Lee-James recorded a song for the CD Act One – Songs From The Musicals Of Alexander S. Bermange, an album of 20 brand new recordings by 26 West End stars, released in November 2008 on Dress Circle Records.

Television credits
Lee-James's television credits include Parkinson (BBC), Party in the Palace (BBC), Party in the Park (Channel 5) and Children in Need (BBC).

Theatre credits
She played the leading role of Scaramouche in We Will Rock You after playing an ensemble role and first understudy for the roles Scaramouche and Meatloaf at the Dominion Theatre in London.
After five and a half years, she said goodbye to the Dominion and Scary Bush on 29 September 2007. 
She played Scaramouche for one and a half years, Meatloaf for another one and a half years, and for two and a half years she was in the ensemble. She played the Narrator in Joseph and the Amazing Technicolor Dreamcoat at the Adelphi Theatre in London, until the show closed in May 2009.

She toured with a Queen tribute show in Scandinavia, with Anders Ekborg, and other West End performers, in November 2007.

During 2012 she toured in Street of Dreams, based on the hit British soap opera Coronation Street, in which she performed as Becky McDonald, originally played by Katherine Kelly, singing the song "If It's Too Late".

She tours internationally performing in gigs and concerts. Her personal life is very private.

References

External links
 Official website
 Unofficial fanpage

Living people
1971 births